Jamie Gilgen  (born 22 October 1981) is a Canadian road and track cyclist, representing Canada at international competitions. She won the gold medal at the 2016 Pan American Track Cycling Championships in the team pursuit. She won the bronze medal at the 2015 Canadian National Road Race Championships.

Major results

2014
 3rd Criterium, National Road Championships
2015
 3rd Road race, National Road Championships
 8th Overall Tulsa Tough
2016
 1st  Team pursuit, Pan American Track Championships (with Ariane Bonhomme, Kinley Gibson and Jasmin Glaesser)
 Milton International Challenge
2nd Scratch
2nd Individual pursuit
3rd Points race
 3rd Tour of Somerville
 8th Grand Prix Cycliste de Gatineau
2017
 1st  Sprints classification Tour of the Gila

References

External links

1981 births
Living people
Canadian female cyclists
Canadian track cyclists
Place of birth missing (living people)